Djibouti Air was an airline based in Djibouti. Its logo depicts the Djibouti spurfowl.

Operations
Djibouti Air was owned by the government of Djibouti as well as a private investor from the United Arab Emirates.

The airline began operations on March 3, 2011, with a flight to Dubai from Djibouti. During the month, it also launched six weekly Djibouti–Dubai flights via its dual-class Boeing 737 aircraft.

With two additional 737s expected, Djibouti Air aims to service 1,500 passengers per month.

In February 2012, the airline suspended its only scheduled services from the Djibouti-Ambouli International Airport to Dubai International Airport.

Destinations
Initially, the airline did fly only to Dubai. Within the first six months, the carrier also plans to launch flights to Ethiopia, Somalia, Yemen, Kenya and Malaysia, after which point it is scheduled to expand coverage to East Asia and Europe. Additionally, it is set to offer more frequent flights to the Middle East.

Fleet
Djibouti Air's fleet included the following aircraft types:

1 Boeing 737-200

References

External links
Official website 

Defunct airlines of Djibouti
Airlines established in 2011
2011 establishments in Djibouti
Companies based in Djibouti (city)